Events from the year 2006 in Finland.

Incumbents
 President: Tarja Halonen
 Prime Minister: Matti Vanhanen
 Speaker: Paavo Lipponen

Events
January 1: Municipalities of Rovaniemi and Rovaniemen maalaiskunta united.
January 15: The first round of the 2006 presidential election.
January 29: Tarja Halonen selected as the president on the second round of the 2006 presidential election. She occupied the position from 2006 to 2012.
March 16: Translation of Harry Potter and the Half-Blood Prince published at midnight.
March 29: Partial solar eclipse.
May 1: Rioting in Helsinki after EuroMayDay demonstrations at the VR warehouses.
May 5: One of the two VR warehouses burned down in an apparent arson attack only a few days before their demolition was to begin.
May 20: Lordi wins the Eurovision Song Contest 2006 in Athens, Greece.
May 26: A crowd of 90,000 celebrates the victory of Eurovision Song Contest 2006 at the Market Square, Helsinki.
May 29: An arsonist burns the roof of the Porvoo Cathedral causing massive damage to the building.
July 1: Finland receives the presidency of the Council of the European Union.
July 25: Jarno Mäkinen, a Finnish UNTSO observer killed in an Israeli attack during the 2006 Israel-Lebanon conflict.
October 22: Gordon B. Hinckley dedicates the Helsinki Finland Temple.

Sports
Winter Olympic Games held in Turin, Italy:
February 26: Finland wins silver after losing to Sweden in the ice hockey.

Births

Deaths
January 5: Ilpo Hakasalo, radio journalist
January 16: Ville-Veikko Salminen, actor
January 25: Matti Tuominen, actor
February 10: Kari K. Laurla, heraldist
February 23: Mauri Favén, painter
April 18: Anna Hagman, the oldest living person in Finland at the time
April 19: Tuure Salo, politician
April 24: Erik Bergman, composer, academician
April 25: Tabe Slioor, socialite, celebrity journalist
May 1: Rauno Lehtinen, conductor, composer
May 3: Nandor Mikola, painter
May 25: Kari S. Tikka, professor of finance, murdered
June 4: Jorma Palo, emeritus professor
July 8: Kari Kontio, author
July 12: Kari Mannerla, board and card game designer
July 12: Jorma Pilkevaara, basketball player
July 14: Alice Kaira, painter
July 16: Aulis Virtanen, sports editor
July 17: Paavo Einiö
July 17: Paula Björkqvist, politician, killed by her husband
July 18: Ilmari Aarre-Ahtio, actor
July 20: Risto Karlsson, journalist and author
August 13: Elina Karjalainen, author
August 15: Jorma Weneskoski, Jazz musician and manager
August 19: Jarkko Laine, author
September 8: Jaakko Pöyry, the founder of Pöyry oyj
November 24: Juice Leskinen, singer and songwriter

References

 
Years of the 21st century in Finland
Finland
2000s in Finland
Finland